The 17th Sustainment Brigade (SB) is a sustainment brigade of the United States Army National Guard in Nevada.

Mission
17th SB provides command and control for 3-7 sustainment of functional logistics battalions and assigned HR/FM companies.  On order conducts theater distribution, supports redeployment operations and provides support to joint, interagency and multinational forces as directed.  Be prepared to support civilian agencies.

History 
The 17th Sustainment Brigade was activated in 2011 to provide command and control for the Special Troops Battalion of the brigade and the 757th Combat Sustainment Support Battalion. In June 2012 the brigade was given administrative control of the 1st Squadron, 221st Cavalry.

Organization
The brigade has the following units assigned during peacetime:
 Special Troops Battalion, 17th Sustainment Brigade (HQ at Las Vegas)
 72d Military Police Company
 100th Quartermaster Company (HQ at Las Vegas)
 593d Transportation Company (Medium)
 1864th Transportation Company
 3665th Ordnance Company (EOD)(HQ at Henderson)
 240th Engineer Company
 777th Engineer Detachment
 757th Combat Sustainment Support Battalion (HQ at Stead)
 106th Public Affairs Detachment
 137th Military Police Company
 150th Maintenance Company (HQ at Carson City)
 609th Engineer Company (HQ at Fallon)
 1859th Transportation Company

References

017
Military units and formations established in 2011